Years in rail transport include:

Before 1700

18th century

19th century

20th century

21st century